Sodium sesquicarbonate (systematic name: trisodium hydrogendicarbonate) Na3H(CO3)2 is a double salt of sodium bicarbonate and sodium carbonate (NaHCO3 · Na2CO3), and has a needle-like crystal structure.  However, the term is also applied to an equimolar mixture of those two salts, with whatever water of hydration the sodium carbonate includes, supplied as a powder.

The dihydrate, Na3H(CO3)2 · 2H2O, occurs in nature as the evaporite mineral trona.

Due to concerns about the toxicity of borax which was withdrawn as a cleaning and laundry product, sodium sesquicarbonate is sold in the European Union (EU) as "Borax substitute". It is also known as one of the E number food additives E500(iii).

Uses 
Sodium sesquicarbonate is used in bath salts, swimming pools, as an alkalinity source for water treatment, and as a phosphate-free product replacing the trisodium phosphate for heavy duty cleaning.

Sodium sesquicarbonate is used in the conservation of copper and copper alloy artifacts that corrode due to contact with salt (called "bronze disease" due to its effect on bronze). The chloride from salt forms copper(I) chloride. In the presence of oxygen and water, even the small amount of moisture in the atmosphere, the cuprous chloride forms copper(II) chloride and hydrochloric acid, the latter of which dissolves the metal and forms more cuprous chloride in a self-sustaining reaction that leads to the entire destruction of the object. Treatment with sodium sesquicarbonate removes copper(II) chlorides from the corroded layer.

It is also used as a precipitating water softener, which combines with hard water minerals (calcium- and magnesium-based minerals) to form an insoluble precipitate, removing these hardness minerals from the water.  It is the carbonate moiety which forms the precipitate, the bicarbonate being included to moderate the material's alkalinity.

References 

Sodium compounds
Carbonates
Acid salts
Double salts
E-number additives